Differential Vascular Labeling is a labeling method that allows differentiation between blood and lymphatic systems for intravital imaging.  This approach takes advantage of the differences in particle distribution across blood and lymphatic endothelia. The DVL is based on a single intravenous injection of a fluorescent particles of different size.  Due to differential distribution of fluorescent particles by size the larger particles remain in blood whereas the smaller once diffuses out of blood and into the lymphatic system thus functionally labeling the vasculature.  Vascular system differentiation by DVL allows for real-time observation of cell traffic across physiological barriers (including lymphocyte traffic and tumor cell metastasis). DVL provides means to differential study the roles of angiogenesis and lymohangiogenesis in tumor metastasis. Lastly, DVL intrinsic fluid phase labeling allows a single-field fluid (either blood or lymph) velocity analysis in intact vascular systems.  Thus DVL allows for the simultaneous determination of fluid flow rates in diverse blood and lymphatic compartments and in newly formed tumor vessels.

References

External links
 Video of DVL results, Sarkisyan et al. (2012) AJP

Medical tests